Whistler's Brother is a platform game designed by Louis Ewens and published in 1984 by Broderbund for the Atari 8-bit and Commodore 64 home computers.

Gameplay

In Whistler's Brother, the player controls not only his character, but also his thoughtless brother. By pressing the fire button, the player character whistles so that his brother (who is not taking his eyes off the map) knows which direction to follow him. Proper timing is important, as failing to whistle will cause the player's brother to go the wrong way and possibly die. The player is tasked with retracing the path of his brother's last expedition and recovering the lost manuscript, artifacts and tools he left behind. 

The game consists of 13 chapters, with the first chapter beginning on a pier where the player must board a ship sailing to South America. In each subsequent chapter, the player will find tools or artifacts that, when collected, give a special power: a spinning that will make the player's character immune to all dangers in his path.

Development

The game's main musical theme is a variation on Johann Sebastian Bach's Prelude in C minor from the first book of The Well-Tempered Clavier.

Reception
Whistler's Brother received fairly positive reviews. Zzap!64 reviewer concluded that "Overall this is an excellent game". Commodore Power/Play, Tom Benford praised the longevity of the game: "Each chapter has its own intricacies, idiosyncrasies, dangers and strategies, so Whistler's Brother will sustain your interest for a long, long time. It's not a game you're going to master in an hour – or ten, for that matter." Antics Jack Powell praised the graphics and animation, but complained about the annoying sound and less than adequate documentation.

References

External links

Review in ANALOG Computing

1984 video games
Atari 8-bit family games
Broderbund games
Commodore 64 games
Platform games
Video games developed in the United States
Video games set in South America